WMYW may refer to:

 WMYW-LP, a low-power radio station (102.7 FM) licensed to serve Paulding, Ohio, United States
 W47CK, a low-power television station (channel 47) licensed to serve Shallotte, North Carolina, United States, which brands itself as WMYW-TV